The Government of Wales Act 1998 (c. 38) is an Act of the Parliament of the United Kingdom. Passed in 1998, the act created the National Assembly for Wales, Auditor General for Wales and transferred devolved powers to the assembly. The act followed the 1997 Welsh devolution referendum.

Act
The Government for Wales Act 1998 brought about the then National Assembly for Wales as a corporate body.

Under the 1998 act, the Welsh Assembly received powers to legislate on powers previously held by the Secretary of State for Wales. Powers included agriculture, forestry, fisheries and food; ancient monuments and historic buildings; culture (including museums, galleries and libraries); economic development; education and training; the environment; health and health services; highways; housing; industry; local government; social services; sport and recreation; tourism; town and country planning; transport; water and flood defence; the Welsh language.

The Act also established the Auditor General for Wales and the Welsh Administration Ombudsman and also gave the National Assembly for Wales the ability to reorganise some Welsh public bodies.

Bill provisions 
On 26 November 1997, the Government of Wales Bill was first read in the House of Commons of the UK Parliament. This followed the white paper policy objectives in further legal detail and added the "First Secretary" role to lead the executive committee of a "National Assembly" (rather than "Assembly for Wales"). The Assembly would be an independent "corporate body" able to make secondary legislation in devolved areas whereas primary legislation powers would stay at Westminster for all matters.The Welsh Assembly would be funded using a "block grant" similarly to the already existing Welsh Office using the Barnett formula.

Welsh Assembly elections would include one vote for a constituency Assembly Member (AM) and one regional vote of Wales' five electoral regions. There would be 40 constituency AM's were elected "first past the post" and 20 "list" AMs were elected via the D'Hondt method.

Clause 34 of the Bill would allow the Assembly to consider “any matter affecting Wales” and a mechanism for potential further transfer of powers to allow the "process" of devolution to continue as suggested by Ron Davies.

The Bill became an Act on 31 July 1998 and, on 1 July 1999, the Welsh Office was replaced with the “Wales Office”.

See also

Welsh devolution
Scotland Act 1998
Royal Commission on the Constitution (United Kingdom)

References 

Government of Wales
Senedd
United Kingdom Acts of Parliament 1998
Constitutional laws of Wales
Acts of the Parliament of the United Kingdom concerning Wales
1998 in Wales
Welsh devolution
July 1998 events in the United Kingdom